"Nostálgico" (English:   Nostalgic) is a song produced by Jamaican record producer Rvssian, written and performed by Puerto Rican singer Rauw Alejandro and American singer Chris Brown, released on September 8, 2021.

Background and composition 
The song marks Brown's fourth collaboration on a Spanish language song, following "Algo Me Gusta de Ti" (2012), "Control" (2014) and "Just As I Am" (2017).

The song is a half Spanish, half English dancehall and reggaeton song, produced by Rvssian, and written by Brown and Alejandro. On the song the singers reminisce on a past relationship that they're currently keeping alive, but just with sex, pretending an improbable love involvement.

Music video
The music video for the song was directed by Edgar Esteves, and shot on April 23, 2021. The videoclip was released along with the song, and show the three musicians partying at a sensual house party, as each of them dance along to the record.

Charts

Weekly charts

Year-end charts

Certifications

Release history

References 

2021 songs
Rauw Alejandro songs
Spanish-language songs
Songs written by Rauw Alejandro
Chris Brown songs
Songs written by Chris Brown
Dancehall songs